Loxostege farsalis is a moth in the family Crambidae. It was described by Hans Georg Amsel in 1950 and is found in Iran.

References

Moths described in 1950
Pyraustinae